The Diocese of Marquette is a Latin Church ecclesiastical territory, or diocese, of the Catholic Church, encompassing the Upper Peninsula region of Michigan in the United States. The diocese is a suffragan diocese in the ecclesiastical province of the metropolitan Archdiocese of Detroit. Its cathedral is St. Peter Cathedral in Marquette, which replaced Holy Name of Mary Pro-Cathedral at Sault Ste. Marie.

Statistics 
The Diocese of Marquette encompasses an area of 16,281 square miles (42,152 square kilometers). , the number of registered Catholics in the diocese was 65,500. There were fifty-eight diocesan priests and 11 religious at 74 parishes and 23 missions. There were 10 parish grade schools. Sixty-three women religious were also in service to the diocese.

History

1700 to 1800 
During the 17th century, present-day Michigan was part of the French colony of New France. The Diocese of Quebec had jurisdiction over the region. The first Catholic Mass in the Upper Peninsula was celebrated in 1641 by French missionary Isaac Jogues, in the area that would later become Sault Sainte Marie.

The first resident pastor in the Upper Peninsula was the French missionary Jacques Marquette, who arrived in 1668. Marquette founded Michigan's first European settlement, Sault Saite Marie, and later founded St. Ignace, Michigan. Other Jesuits would follow, and maintain a presence throughout the years.

In 1763, the Michigan area became part of the British Province of Quebec, forbidden from settlement by American colonists. After the American Revolution, the Michigan region became part of the new United States.  For Catholics, Michigan was now under the jurisdiction of the Archdiocese of Baltimore, which then comprised the entire country.

1800 to 1865 
In 1808, Pope Pius VII erected the Diocese of Bardstown in Kentucky, with jurisdiction over the new Michigan Territory. On June 19, 1821, the pope erected the Diocese of Cincinnati, taking the Michigan Territory from the Diocese of Bardstown.Pope Gregory XVI formed the Diocese of Detroit on March 8, 1833, covering the entire Michigan Territory.  Reverend Frederic Baraga settled at L'Anse in 1843, after forming Catholic missions in Wisconsin. During this time, he earned the nickname "the Snowshoe Priest" because he would travel hundreds of miles each year on snowshoes during the harsh winters. He would devote the rest of his life to evangelizing in the Upper Peninsula. 

On July 29, 1853, Pope Pius IX created the Vicariate Apostolic of Upper Michigan, removing its territory from the Diocese of Detroit. Four years later, on January 9, 1857, the pope converted the Vicarate into to the Diocese of Sault Sainte Marie and named Baraga as its first bishop.

During this time, the area experienced a population explosion, as European immigrants were attracted to work in the copper and iron mines developed near Houghton, Ontonagon, and Marquette. This presented a challenge because he had few priests and attended to immigrant miners and the Native Americans. Increased development and population encouraged by the improvement of transportation on Lake Superior.

Baraga was challenged by the vast diversity of peoples in the region, including the Native American inhabitants, French-Canadian settlers, and the new German and Irish immigrant miners. Difficulties in recruiting staff arose because of the many languages used in the diocese; while Baraga spoke eight languages fluently, he had trouble recruiting priests with equal skills.

1865 to 1900 
In 1865, Baraga transferred his see city from Sault Sainte Marie to Marquette and requested that the Vatican rename the diocese as the Diocese of Sault Sainte Marie and Marquette. His request was approved.  Baraga died in 1868.

On September 25, 1868, Reverend Ignatius Mrak was named as bishop of Sault Saint Marie and Marquette by Pope Pius IX.Over the course of his tenure as bishop, the diocese saw slow development. Mrak increased the number of churches from 21 to 27 and the number of priests from 15 to 20.At the same time, a depression in the Copper Country industry lead to a significant decline in the Catholic population. Two prominent schools, one in Sault Ste. Marie and the other in Hancock, Michigan, closed during his first year as bishop. In 1874, Mrak placed a church in Hancock under interdict after the congregation refused to accept their new pastor. Mrak resigned as bishop in 1879.

To replace Mrak, Pope Leo XIII appointed Reverend John Vertin.Just under a month after his consecration, St. Peter Cathedral in Marquette was destroyed by fire. The fire was allegedly an act of arson by some parishioners angry over the removal of the cathedral's pastor, Reverend John Kenny. Vertin rebuilt the cathedral, laying the cornerstone in June 1881 and consecrating the new building in July 1890. The main altar was a gift from Vertin's father and a side altar was donated by Vertin's brother-in-law.In 1889, Vertin convoked a conference with the diocese's priests, which created an infirm priests' fund and required all Catholic children to attend Catholic school. Over the course of his 20 years as bishop, Vertin oversaw an increase in the diocese's Catholic population from 20,000 to 60,000, the number of churches from 27 to 56, and the number of priests from 20 to 62. After 20 years as bishop, Vertin died in 1899.

1900 to 1940 
On June 7, 1899, Eis was appointed the fourth bishop of the Diocese of Sault Sainte Marie and Marquette by Pope Leo XIII.During Eis' 23-year tenure as bishop, he led the diocese through the nationalist controversies within the American Catholic community, and founded several charitable institutions and hospitals. He was known for being helpful to men wanting to enter seminary and women wanting to join religious orders. Els retired in 1922 and Bishop Paul Nussbaum of the Diocese of Corpus Christi was appointed as his successor by Pope Pius XI that same year. Nussbaum died in 1935.

Pius IX named Auxiliary Bishop Joseph C. Plagens from the Archdiocese of Detroit to replace Nussbaum in 1935. In 1937, the pope dissolved the Diocese of Sault Sainte Marie and Marquette, erecting the Diocese of Marquette instead. In 1938, a transfer of a priest broke into violence.  Plagens had ordered the transfer of Reverend Simon Borkowski, pastor of St. Barbara's Parish in Vulcan, Michigan, to a seminary in Wisconsin.  However, Borkowski had refused to go, instead remaining inside his church with 20 supporters picketing outside.  One day, a group of sixty men arrived at St. Barbara's, pushed past the picketers, and brought Borkowski out of the building.  The newly appointed pastor, Reverend Erasmus Dooley, was allowed to enter.  However, a group of 100 Borkowski supporters soon arrived and a full-scale brawl erupted.  In the end, Dooley left the church and Borkowski re-entered it.

1940 to 1990 
In 1940, Pope Pius XII named Plagens as bishop of the Diocese of Grand Rapids and replace him in Marquette with Reverend Francis Joseph Magner from the Archdiocese of Chicago. During his six-year tenure, Magner provided attention to the mission parishes of the diocese, established the diocesan newspaper and created seven catechetical schools. Manger died in 1947. To replace Manger, Pius XII appointed Coadjutor Bishop Thomas Lawrence Noa of the Diocese of Sioux City later in 1947. Noa in 1952 opened the cause, or initiative, for the canonization of former bishop  Baraga. On August 30, 1953, on the 100th anniversary of the Vicariate Apostolic of Upper Michigan, a centennial mass was held in Marquette.In 1958, Noa issued a directive that Catholics in his diocese should not attend meetings of Moral Re-armament, an international spiritual association, citing its dangers to Catholic faith. Noa resigned as bishop of Marquette in 1968.

In 1968, Pope Paul VI appointed Auxiliary Bishop Charles Salatka of the Diocese of Grand Rapids as bishop of Marquette .  Facing a large financial deficit, Salaka was forced to closed two thirds of the diocesan schools.In September 1972, Salatka established a tribunal as a start of the canonization process for Bishop Baraga.  Salatka was named by Paul VI as archbishop of the Archdiocese of Oklahoma City in 1977.  To replace Salatka, the pope named Auxiliary Bishop Mark Schmitt of the Diocese of Green Bay as the new bishop of Marquette. As bishop, Schmitt founded the  Lay Ministries Leadership School to prepare lay parishioners for leadership roles in parishes. He also create bachelor’s and master’s degree programs in pastoral studies.

1990 to present 
After Schmitt retired in 1992, Pope John Paul II named Auxiliary Bishop James Garland from the Archdiocese of Cincinnati as the next bishop of Marquette. During this time, the diocese celebrated the Jubilee Year 2000.  Events included a diocesan-wide celebration of the Sacrament of Confirmation at the Superior Dome in Marquette.  At that ceremony, 656 youths received the confirmation. An estimated 2,500 people attended a liturgical celebration August 20,2000, at the Mattson Lower Harbor Park, also in Marquette. Garland retired in 2005.

In 2005, Reverend Alexander Sample was appointed the twelfth bishop of the Diocese of Marquette by Pope Benedict XVI. In July 2012, Sample ordained five seminarians to the diaconate, and ten new subdeacons. These new subdeacons include five from the United States for the Institute of Christ the King Sovereign Priest. In 2019, Pope Francis named Sample as archbishop of the Archdiocese of Portland.

The current bishop of Marquette is John Francis Doerfler, appointed by Francis in 2019.

Sex abuse 
In 2020, former Diocese of Marquette priest Gary Allen Jacobs was arrested in New Mexico and charged with 10 criminal charges, including eight counts of first-degree criminal sexual conduct and two counts of second-degree criminal sexual conduct all occurring in the 1980's, from his time in the diocese.

Churches

Bishops

Bishops of Sault Sainte Marie–Marquette 
 Ireneus Frederic Baraga (appointed July 29, 1853; died in office January 19, 1868)
 Ignatius Mrak (appointed September 25, 1868; resigned April 28, 1879)
 John Vertin (appointed May 16 1879; died in office February 26, 1899)
 Frederick Eis (appointed 7 June 7, 1899; resigned July 8, 1922)
 Paul Joseph Nussbaum (appointed November 14, 1922; died in office,June 24, 1935)

Bishops of Marquette 
 Joseph Casimir Plagens (appointed November 13, 1935; appointed Bishop of Grand Rapids December 14, 1940)
 Francis Joseph Magner (appointed December 21, 1940; died in office June  13, 1947)
 Thomas Lawrence Noa (appointed August 20, 1947; resigned January 5, 1968)
 Charles Salatka (appointed January 5, 1968; appointed Archbishop of Oklahoma City September 27,  1977)
 Mark Francis Schmitt (appointed March 21, 1978; resigned October 6, 1992)
 James Henry Garland (appointed October 6. 1992; resigned December 13, 2005)
 Alexander King Sample (appointed December 13, 2005; appointed Archbishop of Portland January 29, 2013)
 John Francis Doerfler (installed February 11, 2014; incumbent)

Other diocesan priests who became bishops 
John Stariha, appointed Bishop of Lead in 1902
Joseph Gabriel Pinten, appointed Bishop of Superior in 1921 and later Bishop of Grand Rapids
Edmund Szoka, appointed Bishop of Gaylord in 1971 and later Archbishop of Detroit, president of the Prefecture for the Economic Affairs of the Holy See, and president of the Pontifical Commission for Vatican City State and Governatorate of Vatican City State (elevated to cardinal in 1988)

See also 

 Catholic Church by country
 Catholic Church hierarchy
 Historical list of the Catholic bishops of the United States
 List of the Catholic dioceses of the United States
 Lists of patriarchs, archbishops, and bishops

References

External links 
Roman Catholic Diocese Of Marquette Official Site 
Catholic Hierarchy: Diocese of Marquette
GCatholic.org

 
Marquette
Marquette
Marquette
Marquette
1853 establishments in Michigan